Syed Mazhar Imam (1908 - 22 February 1988) was an Indian politician and Member of Bihar Legislative Assembly in 1946 and Member of Rajya Sabha (the upper house of the Parliament of India) from 1952 to 1956 and from 1956 to 1962.

Position held

References 

1908 births
1988 deaths
Indian National Congress politicians from Bihar
Bihar MLAs 1952–1957
Bihar MLAs 1957–1962
Rajya Sabha members from Bihar